The business and occupation tax (often abbreviated as B&O tax or B/O tax) is a type of tax levied by the U.S. states of Washington, West Virginia, and, as of 2010, Ohio, and by municipal governments in West Virginia and Kentucky.

It is a type of gross receipts tax because it is levied on gross income, rather than net income.  While deductions are not permitted for labor, materials, or other overhead expenses, the State of Washington does allow certain deductions, exemptions, and credits, by statute.

Alabama

Municipalities in Alabama charge a tax on gross wages called an occupational tax.  This is a tax on employers for providing jobs to the local community.  The municipalities that charge the job providers are:

Attalla 2%

Auburn 1%

Bear Creek 1%

Bessemer 1%

Birmingham 1%

Brilliant 1%

Fairfield 1%

Gadsden 2%

Glencoe 2%

Goodwater 0.75%

Guin 1%

Hackleburg 1%

Haleyville 1%

Hamilton 1%

Leeds 1%

Lynn 1%

Midfield 1%

Mosses 1%

Mountain Brook 0%

Opelika 1.5%

Rainbow City 2%

Red Bay 0.5%

Shorter 1%

Southside 2%

Sulligent 1%

Tuskegee 2%

Washington

Tax rates
The rate of taxation is not uniform for all businesses.  Rather, different types of businesses are taxed at different rates, depending upon their classification by the Washington State Legislature and the Washington State Department of Revenue.  Service industry businesses have the heaviest tax burden, with a tax rate of 1.5%, more than triple the other major classifications.

Major B & O Classifications and their tax rates

Specialized B & O Tax Classifications

Exemptions, deductions, and credits
Income from exempt activities need not be listed on the B & O tax return.  Items claimed as deductions, however, must be listed as part of gross income before it can be taken as a deduction.

Tax credits for the B & O tax can be due to a taxpayer who overpaid his/her taxes for the prior fiscal year.  Additionally, the Legislature has specially created tax credits for certain types of activities.

All exemptions, deductions, and credits are provided for by Chapter 82.04 of the Revised Code of Washington (the chapter which is the legislative basis for the B & O tax) and Title 458 of the Washington Administrative Code (the regulations of the Washington Department of Revenue).  Certain provisions of these laws operate in a similar manner as the Internal Revenue Code and U.S. Treasury Regulations.  For example, bad debt can be deducted from the B & O tax in much the same way as it can be deducted from the federal income tax.

West Virginia

State level
At one time, West Virginia had a broad-based B&O tax at the state level similar to that in Washington. However, this tax is today collected only from public utilities, natural gas storage operators, electricity generators and synthetic fuel manufacturers. These companies are taxed at varying rates according to their business activities. Public utilities are taxed on their gross receipts, gas storage companies on their net storage, power generators on their total capacity, and synfuel manufacturers on their total synfuel sales.

Local level
Although West Virginia has largely scrapped its B&O tax at the state level, it continues to allow municipalities to collect B&O taxes of their own, and this tax is the major source of revenue for most cities in the state. According to the West Virginia State Tax Department, "This tax is imposed on the privilege of engaging in certain business activities." The West Virginia municipal B&O tax is a gross receipts tax, with no deductions whatsoever allowed. Rates vary according to the type of business, and differ from city to city.

For example:
The state capital, Charleston, divides businesses into 14 categories for purposes of B&O taxation. Rates ranging from $0.15 per $100 gross receipts for wholesalers to $4.00 for water companies. Tax is collected on all business activity taking place within the city, regardless of where the business is domiciled, and is also collected on all gross receipts of a business domiciled in Charleston that have not been previously taxed by another local government.
Similarly, the city of Parkersburg divides businesses into 16 different categories for B&O tax purposes, with rates ranging from $0.15 per $100 gross receipts for wholesalers to $3.60 for electric power companies' sales of electricity for domestic use and commercial lighting.

Ohio
Ohio phased out its net income tax on businesses and instituted a gross receipts tax. With the phase-in completed in 2010, Ohio and Washington are the only states with a broad-based gross receipts tax on businesses. However, Ohio's B&O system has a considerably higher threshold for tax liability and lower rates than Washington's system.

References

External links
Washington Department of Revenue brochure on Business tax — provides basic information on tax rates, exempt activities, deductions, and credits.
Washington Dept. of Revenue page on B & O tax
Chapter 82.04 of the Revised Code of Washington
Title 458 of the Washington Administrative Code

Taxation in Ohio
Taxation in Washington (state)
Taxation in West Virginia
Sales taxes